John Barwick (1612–1664) was a royalist churchman.

John Barwick may also refer to:
John Barwick (theologian) ( 1340), English theologian
John Storey Barwick (1840–1915), English industrialist 
Sir John Storey Barwick, 2nd Baronet (1876–1953) of the Barwick baronets